The Language of Love or language of love may refer to:

Language of Love (Swedish: Kärlekens språk) 1969 Swedish sex-education film
The French language or Italian language

Music

Albums
Language of Love, 1961 charting album by John D. Loudermilk
The Language of Love, 2003 album by Carol Welsman
The Language of Love, classical album by Duo Trobairitz - Faye Newton (soprano) and Hazel Brooks (vielle) 
The Language of Love, 2014 album by Julia Fordham

Songs
"Language of Love", hit song by John D. Loudermilk (US No. 32, UK Top 20) in 1961
"The Language of Love", hit song by Dan Fogelberg (US No.13 hit single) from the album Windows and Walls 1984

See also
 Love Language (disambiguation)